Robert W. Johnson (May 4, 1924 – March 20, 2013) was an American politician, lawyer, and tax accountant.

Born in Saint Paul, Minnesota, Johnson served in the United States Navy during World War II. Johnson received his bachelor and law degrees from University of Minnesota. He practiced law and was a tax accountant. He served in the Minnesota House of Representatives as a Republican.

He died in Fountain Hills, Arizona.

Notes

1924 births
2013 deaths
Politicians from Saint Paul, Minnesota
Military personnel from Minnesota
University of Minnesota alumni
University of Minnesota Law School alumni
Minnesota lawyers
Republican Party members of the Minnesota House of Representatives
20th-century American lawyers
United States Navy personnel of World War II